Enrique Simonet Lombardo (February 2, 1866 – April 20, 1927) was a Spanish painter.

Early life
Simonet was born in Valencia. His first vocation of childhood was religious studies, but he abandoned it to devote himself to painting. Despite being Valencian and studying at the Saint Charles Royal Academy of Fine Arts of Valencia, he joined a circle of artists in the city of Málaga. He also attended the workshop of Bernardo Ferrándiz Bádenes, forming part of the Malaga school of painting.

Work and travel
In 1887 obtained a grant to study painting in the Fine Arts Academy in Rome, where he painted in 1890 Heart's Anatomy; a painting that would bring him international recognition and which won him several prizes. Taking advantage of his stay Simonet traveled throughout Italy, visited Paris several times and in 1890 he made a tour of the Mediterranean. He also traveled to the Holy Land, where he painted his monumental work ; work for which he received numerous medals including Madrid in 1892, Chicago in 1893, Barcelona in 1896 and Paris in 1900. In 1893 and 1894 Simonet traveled to Morocco as a war correspondent for the magazine La Ilustración Española y Americana.

Teaching
In 1901 he became professor of Studies and Forms of Nature and Art, at the School of Fine Arts in Barcelona. In 1911 he became a member of the Royal Academy of Fine Arts of San Fernando in Madrid. Between 1921 and 1922 he was director of the Private Paular for landscapers.

Death and legacy
Simonet died on April 20, 1927. He has paintings at Museo del Prado and Museo de Málaga. His painting The Beheading of Saint Paul is in a preferred place at the Malaga Cathedral. Since he was also devoted to decorative painting and landscape, among his surviving works which stand out are the four large canvases on Allegories of Law in the Palace of Justice in Barcelona and Allegories of the Eight Provinces in the Palace of Justice in Madrid.

Paintings

See also
List of paintings by Enrique Simonet (Spanish)
 Judgment of Paris (Simonet)
 List of Orientalist artists
 Orientalism

References

External links
 
 Biography at Museo del Prado 
 About Flevit super illam 
 About Anatomy of the heart (may first have to click second image in first row here to see it)
 About Judgement of Paris 

1866 births
1927 deaths
19th-century Spanish painters
19th-century Spanish male artists
Spanish male painters
20th-century Spanish painters
20th-century Spanish male artists
Painters from the Valencian Community
Orientalist painters